No Greater Love is a live album of performed by multi-instrumentalist Joe McPhee recorded in 1999 and first released on the CIMP label. The album was recorded at the same sessions that produced In the Spirit.

Reception

AllMusic reviewer Steve Loewy states: "While the volume and intensity are toned down a notch from that of some other McPhee excursions, the quality of music is never less than superb". On All About Jazz, Derek Taylor wrote: "Those folks who have already imbibed the intoxicating sounds of In the Spirit will definitely want to check out this second round from the well. Listeners who haven't yet heard either are strongly advised to acquire both and set aside a secluded pair of hours free from worldly distractions to drink this glorious music in".JazzTimes noted the album's "generally uplifting though often contemplative moods".

Track listing 
 "Deep River" (Traditional) – 3:26
 "Deep Sheep" (Dominic Duval, Joe McPhee) – 5:43
 "Nancy" (Joe Giardullo) – 5:59
 "No Greater Love" (Isham Jones, Marty Symes) – 6:20
 "Strangers in a Strange Land" (McPhee) – 11:34
 "Ferocious Beauty" (Giardullo) – 7:57
 "Deep Sleep" (Duval, Michael Bisio) – 11:01
 "Get That Name" (Duval, Giardullo, McPhee, Bisio) – 2:47
 "We Just Think It" (Giardullo, McPhee) – 1:55

Personnel 
Joe McPhee – soprano saxophone
Joe Giardullo – bass clarinet, soprano saxophone
Michael Bisio, Dominic Duval – bass

References 

Joe McPhee albums
2000 albums
CIMP albums